Aanjjan Srivastav (born 2 June 1948) is an Indian film, television and stage actor, associated with Indian People's Theatre Association (IPTA) in Mumbai of which he remained Vice-President for several years. Outside theatre, he is best known as a character actor in Marathi and Hindi films, most notably, Mira Nair's Salaam Bombay!,  Mississippi Masala and Anupam Mittal's Flavors and Bollywood films like Gol Maal, Bemisal, Khuda Gawah, Kabhi Haan Kabhi Naa and Pukar. He has also acted in the TV shows Wagle Ki Duniya (1988) and Wagle Ki Duniya – Nayi Peedhi Naye Kissey (2021).

On television, Srivastav made his mark as the quintessential "common man" in the TV series Wagle Ki Duniya (Wagle's World) (1988–90) and Wagle Ki Nayi Duniya, where he played the lead role, apart from Yeh Jo Hai Zindagi (1984) and Nukkad. He has also acted for more than 40 years in over 30 plays, many of them jubilee hits, including Bakri, Moteram Ka Satyagrah, Shatranj Ke Mohre, Ek Aur Dronacharya and Chakkar Pe Chakkar. One of his serials is Bharat Ek Khoj, based upon Pt. Nehru's Discovery of India, wherein he played various roles.

Early life and education
He was born and brought up in Calcutta (now Kolkata), into a family from Uttar Pradesh and his father was a banker with Allahabad Bank. Anjan did his B.Com. and LLB from Calcutta University, it was here that he started taking part in local Hindi and Bengali theatre groups in 1968, and did plays for All India Radio. Meanwhile, he also did a small role in the film Chameli Mem Shaeb. Soon he acted with noted groups in the city like Kala Bhavan, Sangeet Kala Mandir and Adakar and acted in a few Bengali films.

Career
As per his fathers wishes, he joined the Allahabad Bank, and continued acting in plays on the side. It was only after the death of his sister in 1976 that his father relented and allowed him get transferred to Bombay (now Mumbai) to pursue his acting career further.

Upon arrival, he immediately joined Indian People's Theatre Association (IPTA) and worked in its several productions, and remained with it ever since, after staying its General Secretary of IPTA for a while, he went on to become the Vice-President. He also worked with Prithvi Theatre in the city.

Anjan started his career with Bengali plays like Neel Darpan, Kayakalp and Anwar around the year 1967. In Mumbai, with Indian People's Theatre Association (IPTA), he contributed to several plays including the most renowned Safaid Kundali (The Caucassion chalk circle) by M. S. Sathyu and other Stage plays in the social category with association of the same theatre group. Theatre led to film roles like in Kundan Shah's Saza-E-Maut, Hrishikesh Mukherjee's comedy classic, Gol Maal (1979) and JP Dutta's Ghulami (1985). Then he moved in Television with Yeh Jo Hai Zindagi and went on act in notable TV series like Manoranjan, Tamas, by Govind Nihlani, Nukkad and Katha Sagar, finally in 1987, he received the lead in comedy series, Wagle Ki Duniya, based on R.K. Laxman's common man, which brought him his place in the limelight. He also acted in Shyam Benegal's epic series, Discovery of India.

He often plays skeptical bureaucratic roles, sometimes the conventional narrow-minded father character, and as the veteran actor who effectively enacted the troubles and ways of life of a common-middle-class man in Wagle Ki Duniya, a creation by known cartoonist R.K. Laxman and director Kundan Shah. He has acted in over 127 Hindi films including Kabhi Haan Kabhi Naa, as head hockey official, Mr. Tripathi in Chak De! India, and in other films like Raju Ban Gaya Gentleman and No Entry and many other characters in various films. In 2005, he played the lead in M.S. Sathyu's production Raat, written by Javed Siddiqui and based on Ariel Dorfman's play Death and the Maiden.
Other plays Anjan continues to do include Moteram Ka Satyagrah, directed by M. S. Sathyu, based on the writings of Munshi Premchand and Safdar Hashmi and Kashmakash, directed by Ramesh Talwar. These plays mostly run at Prithvi Theatre, Mysore Association-Sion, TejPal Auditorium. Anjan's Moteram Ka Satyagrah and Shatranj Ke Mohre are some plays which have been running now for more than 20 years.

All through his acting career, he remained a bank employee from where he later retired in 2001.

Theatre shows

Selected television shows
 Yeh Jo Hai Zindagi (1984)
 Nukkad (1986–1988)
 Bharat Ek Khoj (1988)
 Wagle Ki Duniya (1988–1990) as Wagle 
 Naya Nukkad (1993-1994)
 Paltan (1997)
 Alpviram (1998) as Amrita's grandfather
 Bhanwar (1998–1999)
 Woh Rehne Waali Mehlon Ki (2005)
 Virrudh (2007-2008) as Pandeyji
 Mrs. & Mr. Sharma Allahabadwale (2010) as Sarveshwarprasad Mukteshwarprasad Sharma
 Na Bole Tum... Na Maine Kuch Kaha (2012) as Vedkant Vyas
 Samvidhaan (2014) as Pandit Balkrishna Sharma
 Chandrashekhar (2018) as Lala Lajpat Rai
 Wagle Ki Duniya – Nayi Peedhi Naye Kissey (2021–present) as Srinivas Wagle

Selected filmography

 Gol Maal (1979) (Inspector)
 Sazaye Maut (1981)
Kaalia (1981) ... Constable in central jail
 Aagaman (1982)
 Bemisal (1982) - Doctor
 Saath Saath (1982) -  Dr. B.M. Acharya
Lorie (1984)
Vivek (1985)
 Ghulami (1985)
 Jawaab (1985) - Mehta (Journalist)
 Loha (1987) - Champaklal
 Mr India (1987)  - Baburam
 Kaash (1987)
 Aakhri Adalat (1988) - Dr. Abdul Rehman
 Shahenshah (1988)- Mr. Pathak
 Salaam Bombay! (1988)   - Psychic Superintendent
 Dayavan (1988) - S.P. Raghavan
 Abhi To Main Jawan Hoon (1989)
 Main Azaad Hoon (1989) - Rastogi
 Awwal Number (1990) - Cricket Commentator 
 Agneepath (1990)
 Yodha (1991) - Mantri
 Narasimha (1991) - Narasimha's dad
 Mississippi Masala (1991) - Jammubhai
 Khuda Gawah (1992) - Kamaljit
 Jo Jeeta Wohi Sikandar (1992) - Race commentator
 Chamatkar (1992) - Tripathi-Inspector/commissioner
Isi Ka Naam Zindagi (1992) - Doctor
Dil Hi To Hai (1992 film) - Minister
 Raju Ban Gaya Gentleman (1992) - Saxena
 Roop Ki Rani Choron Ka Raja (1993)- Mr. Narang
 Damini - Lightning (1993) - Chandrakant (Damini's dad)
 Dilwale (1994)
 Kabhi Haan Kabhi Naa (1994) - Vinayak
 Ghatak: Lethal (1996)   - Dhamu Kaka
 Gupt: The Hidden Truth (1997) - Commissioner Patwardhan
 Sanam (1997)
 China Gate (1998) - Pandey/DK
 Pyaar To Hona Hi Tha (1998) - Shekhar's Father
 Bandhan (1998)
 Chakravyuh (Bengali) (2000)
 Pukar (2000)
 Dr. Babasaheb Ambedkar (2000) - Sayajirao Gaekwad III
 Dattak (2001)
 Little John (2001) by Singheetam Srinivas Rao
 Pyaar Ishq Aur Mohabbat (2001)
 Lajja (2001)
 Shararat (2002)
 Stumped (2003)
 Flavors (2003)
 Run (2004)
 Aan: Men at Work (2004)
 Chak De! India (2007) - Mr. Tripathi
 Halla Bol (2008) - Amanullah Khan
 Flavors (2004) -  Mr. Gopalkrishna
 What's Your Raashee? (2009) - Bharatbhai Patel
 Yuvvraaj (2008) - Om Mama ji
 Nishani Dava Angatha (2009) - Marathi Film
 Mittal v/s Mittal (2010) - Mitali's Father|
 Paathshaala (2010)
 Tees Maar Khan (2010)
 Arjun: The Warrior Prince (2012) - (Animation) Lord Shiva
 P Se PM Tak (2014)
 SEZ (2014) - Marathi Film
 Ek Nadir Galpo: Tale of a River (2014) - (Bengali) by Sameer Chanda
 Jab Harry Met Sejal (2017)
 Amma (2017)
 Ek Thi Rani Aisi Bhi (2017)
 Firangi (2017)
 Sanju (2018)
 Junction Varanasi (2018)
 PM Narendra Modi (2019)
 Chandigarh Kare Aashiqui (2021)

References

External links
 
 Anjan Srivastav:Filmography at Bollywood Hungama

1948 births
Living people
Male actors from Kolkata
Indian male stage actors
Indian People's Theatre Association people
Indian male film actors
Male actors in Hindi cinema
Indian male television actors
St. Paul's Cathedral Mission College alumni
University of Calcutta alumni
21st-century Indian male actors
People from Ghazipur